Jarso may refer to:

 Jarso (Hararge), a woreda in the Oromia Region of Ethiopia
 Jarso (Welega), a woreda in the Oromia Region of Ethiopia